Justiniano is both a surname and a masculine given name. Notable people with the name include:

People with the surname
Alberto Justiniano, American theatre director
Gonzalo Justiniano (born 1955), Chilean theatre director
Leonel Justiniano (born 1992), Bolivian footballer
Pedro Justiniano (born 2000), Portuguese footballer
Raúl Justiniano (born 1977), Bolivian footballer

People with the given name
Justiniano Asunción (1816–1901), Filipino painter
Justiniano Borgoño (1836–1921), Peruvian soldier and politician
Justiniano Borja (1912–1964), Filipino politician
Justiniano González Betancourt (born 1936), Mexican politician
Justiniano Montano (1905–2005), Filipino politician

Masculine given names